In probability theory the hypoexponential distribution or the generalized Erlang distribution is a continuous distribution, that has found use in the same fields as the Erlang distribution, such as queueing theory, teletraffic engineering and more generally in stochastic processes. It is called the hypoexponetial distribution as it has a coefficient of variation less than one, compared to the hyper-exponential distribution which has coefficient of variation greater than one and the exponential distribution which has coefficient of variation of one.

Overview
The Erlang distribution is a series of k exponential distributions all with rate . The hypoexponential is a series of k exponential distributions each with their own rate , the rate of the  exponential distribution. If we have k independently distributed exponential random variables , then the random variable,

is hypoexponentially distributed.

Relation to the phase-type distribution

As a result of the definition it is easier to consider this distribution as a special case of the phase-type distribution. The phase-type distribution is the time to absorption of a finite state Markov process. If we have a k+1 state process, where the first k states are transient and the state k+1 is an absorbing state, then the distribution of time from the start of the process until the absorbing state is reached is phase-type distributed. This becomes the hypoexponential if we start in the first 1 and move skip-free from state i to i+1 with rate  until state k transitions with rate  to the absorbing state k+1. This can be written in the form of a subgenerator matrix,

For simplicity denote the above matrix . If the probability of starting in each of the k states is

then

Two parameter case

Where the distribution has two parameters the explicit forms of the probability functions and the associated statistics are

CDF: 

PDF: 

Mean: 

Variance: 

Coefficient of variation: 

The coefficient of variation is always < 1.

Given the sample mean and sample coefficient of variation, the parameters  and  can be estimated as follows:

Characterization
A random variable  has cumulative distribution function given by,

and density function,

where  are the Lagrange basis polynomials associated with the points .

The distribution has Laplace transform of

Which can be used to find moments,

General case
In the general case
where there are  distinct sums of exponential distributions
with rates  and a number of terms in each
sum equals to  respectively. The cumulative

with

with the additional convention .

Uses

This distribution has been used in population genetics, cell biology, and queuing theory

See also
 Phase-type distribution
 Coxian distribution

References

Further reading

 M. F. Neuts. (1981) Matrix-Geometric Solutions in Stochastic Models: an Algorthmic Approach, Chapter 2: Probability Distributions of Phase Type; Dover Publications Inc.
 G. Latouche, V. Ramaswami. (1999)  Introduction to Matrix Analytic Methods in Stochastic Modelling, 1st edition. Chapter 2: PH Distributions; ASA SIAM,
 Colm A. O'Cinneide (1999). Phase-type distribution: open problems and a few properties, Communication in Statistic - Stochastic Models, 15(4), 731–757.
 L. Leemis and J. McQueston (2008). Univariate distribution relationships, The American Statistician, 62(1), 45—53.
 S. Ross. (2007) Introduction to Probability Models, 9th edition, New York: Academic Press
 S.V. Amari and R.B. Misra (1997) Closed-form expressions for distribution of sum of exponential random variables,IEEE Trans. Reliab. 46, 519–522
 B. Legros and O. Jouini (2015) A linear algebraic approach for the computation of sums of Erlang random variables, Applied Mathematical Modelling, 39(16), 4971–4977
 

Continuous distributions

zh:Erlang分布